College of Computer Science & Engineering at Yanbu (CCSEY) was established in Yanbu, Saudi Arabia, in 1430 Hejri, related to 2010, one of the Taibah University colleges in Yanbu branch, CCSEY is located in Yanbu AL-Bahar, in Medina Region, Yanbu the coastal city which is overlooking the Red Sea. the College offers diploma and undergraduate programs in different computer  areas, the number of CCSEY students are nearly 500 students, 25  faculty members, and 25 employees. 

In 2013 CCSEY started transferring into Learning organization to adapt to the  Knowledge Society age, first through its Strategic Plan, and then by adopting the Cisco Networking Academy curriculum (In the academic year 2014-2015), in order to expand employment options for its graduates and help advance their careers.

See also

List of universities in Saudi Arabia

References

External links
 Channel of Computer Science and Engineering at Yanbu on YouTube

2010 establishments in Saudi Arabia
Taibah University
Universities and colleges in Saudi Arabia
Medina
Educational institutions established in 2010
Yanbu